Shitan Town is an urban town in Xiangtan County, Hunan Province, People's Republic of China.  it had a population of 74,000 and an area of .

Administrative division
The town is divided into 42 villages and 4 communities, the following areas:
 
 Zhengjie Community
 Hengjie Community
 Shanmuqiao Community
 Yaoshang Community
 Shuangma Village
 Maqiao Village
 Raotian Village
 Kengshan Village
 Zhongtang Village
 Lianbin Village
 Ziyun Village
 Yangzi Village
 Guangrong Village
 Baituo Village
 Wenjiatan Village
 Caotang Village
 Honhwang Village
 Maotang Village
 Zhongba Village
 Tunxia Village
 Xinwei Village
 Longquan Village
 Liema Village
 Shangyue Village
 Puqing Village
 Hede Village
 Ganlutang Village
 Longgutang Village
 Qingshanzui Village
 Fengshuting Village
 Xinzhuang Village
 Xinhe Village
 Xiangshao Village
 Furongtang Village
 Bajiaoting Village
 Jiulong Village
 Tonghu Village
 Fenshui Village
 Bailong Village
 Lianhuaba Village
 Gucheng Village
 Guyun Village
 Shizhutang Village
 Zhaotuo Village
 Tuoxia Village
 Lianmeng Village

History
In May 1955, Shitan Town was built.

Economy
Rice is important to the economy.

Culture
Huaguxi is the most influence local theater.

References

Divisions of Xiangtan County